Keep The Faith is the twentieth studio album by Bryn Haworth.

Track listing

 "Keep The Faith"
 "Everybody Wants to Go To Heaven"
 "I’m In Love With You"
 "Wash Me Clean"
 "New ID"
 "Psalm 40"
 "Wings Of The Wind"
 "Salema"
 "Satisfied"
 "Simple Pleasures"
 "One Good Woman"

Personnel 

Bryn Haworth – guitars, mandolins and vocals
Henry Spinetti – drums
Martin Neil – percussion
Dave Bronze – bass all tracks except: "Psalm 40" and "Wings of the Wind" (Les Moir) and "Salema and Satisfied" (Tim Harries) 
Steve Gregory – saxophone and brass arrangements
Paul D’Olivera - trumpet
Mark Edwards - keyboards
Mal Pope - backing vocals

2005 albums
Bryn Haworth albums